A referendum on grain supply was held in Switzerland on 5 December 1926. Voters were asked whether they approved of adding article 23bis to the constitution, which concerned grain supply. The proposal was rejected by a majority of voters and cantons.

Background
The referendum was a mandatory referendum, which required a double majority; a majority of the popular vote and majority of the cantons. The decision of each canton was based on the vote in that canton. Full cantons counted as one vote, whilst half cantons counted as half.

Results

References

1926 referendums
1926 in Switzerland
Referendums in Switzerland